Tower Two-Sixty, alternatively known as “The Gardens at Market Square” or “The Gardens,” is a Millcraft Investments skyscraper in Pittsburgh, Pennsylvania, United States. Construction began in 2013 and was substantially completed in 2016. The $107 million, LEED CS Silver-certified tower  consists of 18 floors  and is located the Market Square and Point Park University sections of Downtown Pittsburgh. The tower includes a 197-room Hilton Garden Inn Hotel  and Market Square Garage, 321-car parking complex  managed by Alco Parking.

It includes 20,000 square feet of street level retail space, 130,000 square feet of Class-A "tower office" floor space  and multiple restaurants.

Revel + Roost, previously known as Roost Fifty New American Kitchen, is a two-floor restaurant. Roost hosts upscale dining on the second floor, while Revel has an ultra-lounge atmosphere downstairs. 
Pirata  is another restaurant tenant, offering Caribbean-style food and more than 200 rums. 
Pizzuvio, a fine casual Neapolitan pizzeria with handmade wood-fired ovens, is also located in the tower. 
Millie’s, a second location Pittsburgh-based small batch ice creamery originating in Shadyside.

In 2015, it was announced that commercial real estate company JLL  would be the building’s anchor and namesake tenant, and re-identify the building as JLL Center at Tower Two-Sixty. JLL also serves as the building’s property manager. Other tenants in the building include Merrill Lynch, Coury Financial Group, McGuireWoods, and Millcraft itself.

Millcraft, JLL, and its partners have received several awards for Tower Two-Sixty including the Urban Land Institute award for Transformative Place, Master Builders’ Association of Western Pennsylvania Award, NAIOP Pittsburgh’s Best Mixed Use Project .

References

External links

Construction Cam

Skyscraper hotels in Pittsburgh
Office buildings in Pittsburgh